Tischeria ekebladella is a moth of the family Tischeriidae. It is found in most of Europe and the Caucasus.

The wingspan is 8–11 mm. Forewings deep ochreous yellow, suffusedly irrorated with fuscous towards costa posteriorly and apex. Hindwings rather dark grey. Closely resembles Tischeria dodonea. Certain identification requires examination of a genitalia preparation.
Adults are on wing from May to June depending on the location.

The larvae feed on Castanea mollissima, C. sativa, Quercus cerris, Q. dalechampii, Q. faginea, Q. frainetto, Q. macranthera, Q. macrocarpa, Q. macrolepis, Q. pedunculiflora, Q. petraea, Q. pubescens, Q. robur, Q. rubra and Q. serrata × turneri. They mine the leaves of their host plant. The mine consists of a milky white upper-surface primary blotch, sometimes with an orange hue. There is no trace of a preceding corridor. The inside is lined with silk, but the mine remains completely flat. The larva makes a discoid cocoon, where it rests when not feeding. The mine contains practically no frass, which is removed through a cut in the upper epidermis near the margin of the mine. Pupation takes place within the mine.

Gallery

External links
 Plant Parasites of Europe
  UKmoths
 Swedish Moths

Tischeriidae
Moths described in 1795
Moths of Europe
Moths of Asia
Taxa named by Clas Bjerkander